Anthony Raymond Bell  is professor of physics at the University of Oxford and the Rutherford Appleton Laboratory. He is a senior research fellow at Somerville College, Oxford.

Education
Bell was educated at the University of Cambridge where he was awarded a PhD in radio astronomy in 1977 for research investigating supernova remnants.

Career and research
Following his PhD, Bell worked on radar signal processing with Marconi Electronic Systems before moving to the Central Laser Facility as a laser-plasma theorist. In 1985 he was appointed a lecturer at Imperial College London. In 2007, following two years with the Methodist Church, he was jointly appointed at the Clarendon Laboratory and the Central Laser Facility.

Bell's research investigates plasma physics. He wrote one of four independent papers proposing the theory of cosmic ray acceleration by shocks. He showed how strong magnetic field is generated during particle acceleration and how it enables cosmic ray acceleration to high energy. He initiated the theory of non-local transport for heat flow in inertial confinement fusion, explained the collimation of laser-produced energetic electrons by resistively generated magnetic field, and with John G. Kirk demonstrated the possibility of electron-positron pair production in ultra-high intensity laser-plasma interactions.

Awards and honours
Bell was awarded the 2014 Fred Hoyle Medal and Prize of the Institute of Physics "for elucidating the origin and impact of cosmic rays and for his seminal contributions to electron energy transport in laboratory plasmas". In 2016 he was awarded the Eddington Medal of the Royal Astronomical Society for "his development of the theory of the acceleration of charged particles in astrophysics, known as Diffusive Shock Acceleration". He was elected a Fellow of the Royal Society (FRS) in 2017.

References

Year of birth missing (living people)
Living people
British physicists
Donegall Lecturers of Mathematics at Trinity College Dublin
Fellows of the Royal Society
Fellows of Somerville College, Oxford